Toepen (/ˈtupə(n)/) is a trick-taking Dutch card game for three to eight players, and is often played as a drinking game. Typically the number of players is 4.

Gameplay
Every player is dealt 4 cards from a 32 card deck. The cards are played one at a time face up in tricks. The first card played in a trick determines the suit for that trick. A player must follow suit to win. The goal is to win the last trick. The order of the cards is 10(high), 9, 8, 7, A, K, Q, J. All of the players excluding the winner of the fourth and final trick receives a point. A player may toep or increase the number of points at stake during a round at any time during play. Each toep increases the point value of the round by one. A toep is usually signified by a knock on the playing surface. Upon toeping the opposing players may either fold and receive the previous point total or risk receiving the new increased total by remaining in the round. Once a player reaches a certain number of points he or she is eliminated. The maximum number of points is typically 10 or 15, depending on the price of beverages.

The winner of the round (so the winner of the last trick) has to deal in the next round and the player on the left of the dealer can start the first trick of the next round. The winner of a trick can start the next trick in the same round. A special action comes across when a player is one point short of the maximum and is in pelt (poverty). In order to protect this player, the player on pelt can always start the round, independent of the dealer. Thereby all other players have to decide whether they want to play the round for 2 points or leave (before one card is played) for 1 point.

Deal and exchange
Toepen is usually played as a drinking game, but can also be played with chips or directly with money. Each player receives four cards. The remainder of the pack is left face down in the middle of the table. Then any player whose hand consists entirely of As, Ks, Qs and Js may discard his hand face downward and deal himself/herself a new one. Indeed, any player may discard their hand in this way. However any exchange may be challenged by another player. If a player making an exchange is found to have 10, 9, 8 or 7 in their original hand, the discarder loses one life (but keeps the new hand), while if it was correct, the challenger loses one life. When a player has lost ten lives, he/she buys a round of drinks (or contributes to the drinks kitty or contributes an agreed number of chips to the pot), the score is wiped clean and the next rubber starts. A player who has already lost nine lives may not knock. Similarly, a player who has already lost eight lives may not make the second knock, one who has already lost seven lives may not make the third knock, and so on.

Additional rules for the drinking game
Player to dealer's left leads first. Players must follow suit if possible, otherwise they may play any card. A trick is won by the highest card of the suit led, and the winner leads to the next trick. The winner of the fourth and last trick will deal the next hand. Each of the other players loses a life or lives. A player who holds three tens must whistle. A player who holds three jacks may whistle. A player who holds four tens must stand up. A player who holds four jacks may stand up. If a player is obliged to whistle but cannot, he must sing loudly.

Example
The score is maintained by peat. A normal game goes to a score of 10 or 15 points. These are penalty points. the one who wins the last move does not get any points. The other players receive a number of penalty points. Here is an example.

Name:	    Points

Thijs:	    |||

Tame:	    ||||| ||||| ||||

Thomas:	    ||||| |||

Stan:       ||||| |

You can “toep,” this means that more points are played. This example shows that Tame has often gone and often lost. Thijs has often won and has a low number of points. He has a great chance of winning. When he wins three times, he's a “Toepkoning”. Thomas plays average and Stan is probably a “lijntoeper”. This means that it only lasts when it is certain that it is winning. In this example, Tame insists on poverty. This means that when he gets another point, he's out of the game. Now the other players have to choose if they want to play. In the event that they last, two points are played.

See also

Bonken
Drinking games
 List of drinking games

Notes

External links
Pagat.com

Last trick group
Dutch card games
Drinking card games
Drinking games
Multi-player card games

sv:Lista över kortspel#T